Lowell Raymond Palmer (born August 18, 1947) is a retired American professional baseball pitcher who appeared in 106 games in Major League Baseball (MLB) as a member of four different teams over all or portions of five seasons (– and ).

Baseball career
Palmer graduated from Norte Del Rio High School and attended American River College, both in Sacramento. He was selected by the Philadelphia Phillies in the first round (sixth overall) of the 1966 Major League Baseball Draft (Secondary Phase). Palmer was called up to the Phillies after posting a 36–17 won–lost record in 3 minor league seasons, with 534 strikeouts in 516 innings pitched.

Major leagues
He made his major league debut on June 21, 1969, with a starting assignment against the Pittsburgh Pirates at Connie Mack Stadium. He held Pittsburgh scoreless through the game's first six innings, but unraveled in the seventh and eighth innings, permitting five earned runs; he was tagged with the Phils' 8–2 defeat.

Palmer threw a three-hit, complete game and shutout in his third MLB appearance, against the Montreal Expos at Jarry Park Stadium on June 29, but overall he struggled to a 2–8 record in 1969, with a 5.20 earned run average, in 29 games during his rookie campaign. He would throw only one more complete game in his major-league career, that coming in his final season. In Palmer's MLB tenure as a member of the Phillies (1969–1971), St. Louis Cardinals (1972), Cleveland Indians (1972) and San Diego Padres (1974), he posted a career record of 5–18; his earned run average for in his 106 career MLB appearances (with 25 starts) was 5.29. 

One of his main problems was wildness, as he walked a total of 202 batters in just 316 innings pitched. His BB/9IP was 5.74, much higher than the major league average at that time. He also hit seven batters in 1974, ranking third in the league. As a power pitcher, however, he struck out 239 batters, giving him a K/9IP of 6.79, which was higher than the major league average. Including his career walks, hit batsmen (23), and hits allowed (302), Palmer gave up a total of 527 baserunners in his 316 innings pitched. His final pro season was 1977.

References

External links

Lowell Palmer at Pura Pelota (Venezuelan Professional Baseball League)

1947 births
Living people
American River Beavers baseball players
American River College alumni
Baseball players from Sacramento, California
Cardenales de Lara players
Cleveland Indians players
Columbus Clippers players
Eugene Emeralds players
Florida Instructional League Phillies players
Major League Baseball pitchers
Oklahoma City 89ers players
Philadelphia Phillies players
Sacramento Solons players
St. Louis Cardinals players
San Diego Padres (minor league) players
San Diego Padres players
Spartanburg Phillies players
Syracuse Chiefs players
Tidewater Tides players
Tigres del Licey players
American expatriate baseball players in the Dominican Republic
Tucson Toros players
Tulsa Oilers (baseball) players
West Palm Beach Tropics players